Europium chloride may refer to:

 Europium(III) chloride (europium trichloride), EuCl3
 Europium dichloride (europium(II) chloride), EuCl2